Nagorno-Karabakh war may refer to:

Most often
 First Nagorno-Karabakh War (1988–1994)
 2016 Nagorno-Karabakh conflict
 Second Nagorno-Karabakh war (2020)

Military clashes at least partly in Nagorno-Karabakh
 2008 Mardakert clashes
 2010 Mardakert clashes
 2010 Nagorno-Karabakh clashes
 2012 Armenian–Azerbaijani border clashes
 2016 Nagorno-Karabakh conflict
 2014 Armenian–Azerbaijani clashes
 September 2022 Armenia–Azerbaijan clashes

Military clashes outside Nagorno-Karabakh but part of the broader conflict
 2018 Armenian–Azerbaijani clashes
 July 2020 Armenian–Azerbaijani clashes
 2021–2022 Armenia–Azerbaijan border crisis

See also
 Nagorno-Karabakh conflict
 Armenian–Azerbaijani war (disambiguation)
 Battle of Qarabagh